Blue Foundation is a Danish band. Their cinematic dream pop, shoegaze and electronics inspired compositions are known for being featured in films such as  Twilight, Miami Vice and on TV shows including CSI: Miami and The Vampire Diaries.

Danish Tobias Wilner founded the group in 2000 recruiting a rotating cast of traditional musicians throughout the band's history to inspire creativity. Since 2003 the core of the band has been Tobias Wilner and Bo Rande,  based in Prospect Heights, Brooklyn and Copenhagen, Denmark.

Blue Foundation released their fifth album Blood Moon worldwide on 2 September 2016. The album featured appearances from Mark Kozelek (Sun Kil Moon/ Red House Painters), Erika Spring (Au Revoir Simone/ Nice As Fuck), Jonas Bjerre (Mew), Sonya Kitchell, Sara Savery (aka Drop the Gun) and Findlay Brown.

History
Blue Foundation released their first 7" via Moshi Moshi Records, and their first, self-titled, album was released shortly thereafter. Three years later, in 2003, the band signed with EMI/Warner Music releasing 2 critically acclaimed albums, released in the US through Astralwerks Records.

In 2008, Blue Foundation established their own imprint, Dead Peoples Choice, that so far has released two albums and one remix album. Blue Foundation gained major recognition with a remix by Zeds Dead of their song "Eyes On Fire", reaching a no. 3 ranking on iTunes Electronic Music Chart (2014). Today "Eyes On Fire" has more than 35 million YouTube plays, while the "Zeds Dead"-remix has exceeded 110 million YouTube plays. During the years Blue Foundation have expanded their audience, embracing today both the underground and the alternative mainstream.

Blue Foundation has been featured in major films such as Twilight, Miami Vice and on TV shows including CSI: Miami and The Vampire Diaries. Their music is sampled by ex Lil Durk feat. French Montana on "Fly High", Young Thug on "She Noticed" and on Curren$y's "Hustler".

Today's live line-up includes Italian Federico Ughi on drums (The Cinematic Orchestra) and American Sonya Kitchell. Despite her only 28-years, US Grammy-winner Sonya Kitchell already released three solo albums plus appearances on Herbie Hancock and Joni Mitchell albums to her name. Blue Foundation have toured extensively around Europe, Asia and the US through the years, performing alongside bands like Faithless, Mew, The Killers and DJ Krush.

Bo Rande is an accomplished musician, songwriter and producer, as well as a trumpet-player known for his tone and style. His style encompasses jazz, world music, pop music and ambient. He is also a member of the Danish band The William Blakes (two-time winner of the Danish Music Awards) and the sought after klezmer orchestra Mames Babegenush. He has toured the world with Mames Babegenush, playing both Carnegie Hall, Argentina and around Europe. Besides that he has been a sought after musician, playing with Mew, Apparatjik, Efterklang and many many others, both live and on recording.

In October 2005, Tobias Wilner released an album with his side project, Bichi. The title of the album is Notwithstanding, and is released by Thomas Knak on his label, Hobby Industries. Some of the Bichi work would later turn into Blue Foundation songs. The Blue Foundation song, This is Goodbye, from the movie Manslaughter, was originally the instrumental song Revolve In The Sun/My Footfalls Are Superfluous, from the album Notwithstanding. Also, the Bichi song It Begins, featured in the movie Waking Madison, by Katherine Brooks, was re-recorded and later released as a Blue Foundation version.

On 1 February 2009 Tobias Wilner established DPC Records, mainly to release Blue Foundation, Bichi and his band Ghost Society. Later that year Blue Foundation went double platinum in USA for the Twilight Soundtrack. The album was certified double platinum on 16 April 2009.
The Blue Foundation song Watch you Sleeping, with singer songwriter Mark Kozelek (Red House Painters, Sun Kil Moon), and former member Kirstine Stubbe Teglbjærg was released as a single on DPC.

Blue Foundation contributed with two songs for the soundtrack of the award-winning documentary film Tankograd, by director Boris Benjamin Bertram. One of the songs signals a change in female vocalists. The lead vocals are done by Sara Savery (Ghost Society and People Press Play). 
Blue Foundation also did the soundtrack for the short film Go All Day, featuring professional skateboarder Chaz Ortiz, Directed by Steve Berra and Colin Kennedy, and Produced by Gatorade and The Berrics. The score was later released as the Blue Foundation single Red Hook, in a cooperation between The Berrics and DPC Records.

DPC Records announced that the band is working on a new album in their Brooklyn studio. It is meant to be released in 2016.

Influences
When Blue Foundation started out they were influenced by bands like My Bloody Valentine, Stereolab, Broadcast, Faust, DJ Krush, Friction and Can.

Discography

Studio albums
 Blue Foundation (April Records 2001)
 Sweep of Days (Virgin 2004)
 Solid Origami collected, reworked and remixed (Pop Group 2006)
 Life of a Ghost (EMI/Astralwerks 2007)
 In My Mind I Am Free (Dead People's Choice 2012)
 In My Mind I Am Free / Reconstructed (Dead People's Choice 2013)
 Blood Moon (2016)
 Silent Dream (2019)

EP
 Dead People's Choice (EMI 2006)
 It Begins (Dead People's Choice 2011)
 Live In Zhangbei (Dead People's Choice 2015)

Singles
 "Hollywood & Hide" 7" (Moshi Moshi Records 2000)
 "Hollywood & Wiseguy" 12" (April Records 2000)
 "As I Moved On" 12" (Virgin 2003)
 "End of the Day" (Virgin 2004)
 "This is Goodbye" (Virgin 2005)
 "Embers" 7" (Jack To Phono Records 2005)
 "Crosshair" (Virgin 2006)
 "Enemy" (EMI 2007)
 "Eyes on Fire" (EMI 2009)
 "Watch you Sleeping" feat. Mark Kozelek / "Dream (3:11PM)" (DPC Records 2009)
 "Heads on Fire" (DPC Records 2011)
 "Broken Life" (2011)
 "Red Hook" (DPC Records 2011)
 "Lost" (Dead People's Choice 2012)
 "Live From Brooklyn" (Dead People's Choice 2016)

Remix work
 Klart Der! Jorden Kalder Blue Foundation & Mixologists Remix (2000)
 Fauna Flash Mother Nature Blue Foundation Remix (Compost 2001)
 Mew Symmetry Blue Foundation Remix (Evil Office 2001)
 Zeds Dead "Eyes On Fire" Blue Foundation Remix (2007)
 Jonas Bjerre Window Pane Blue Foundation Remix (PLUK 2011)
 Ghost Society Under The Sun Blue Foundation Remix (DPC 2012)
 Apparatjik Datascroller Blue Foundation Remix (DPC 2012)
 Allies For Everyone Supernatural Blue Foundation Remix (KID Recordings 2013)
 Ninety's Remix "Bonfires" Blue Foundation Remix (Trap City 2013)

Compilations
 Confusion (Compost Records 2003)
 Benetton's Colors: A Nordic Compilation (Irma Records 2003)
 Warp Factor (King Kladze Records/Time Warp 2003)
 Who Shot Jacques Laverne? (Jack To Phono Records 2004)
 We Got Monkeys: Five Years Of Moshi Moshi Records (Moshi Moshi Records 2005)
 Paris mixed by Nick Warren (Global Underground 2007)
 Sequential vol 2. mixed by Hernan Cattaneo (Renainnance 2007)
 Director's Cut: Music from the Films of Michael Mann (Rhino 2007)
 Sirenes (Spectacle Entertainment 2008)
 Michael Moshi's Moshi Mixtape (Moshi Moshi Records 2010)
 Compost Downbeat Selection, Vol. 1 (Compost 2010)
 Sound of Dubstep 3 (Ministry of Sound 2011)
 Together We Are Not Alone (THISTIME 2011)

Selected soundtracks
 Manslaughter (Zentropa/EMI) 26 August 2005
 Nordkraft (Nimbus Film) 2005
 Miami Vice (Atlantic Recording) 18 July 2006
 Twilight (Chop Shop Records/Atlantic Recording) 4 November 2008
 Normal (Bontonfilm) 26 March 2009
 Tankograd (DPC Records) 16 May 2011

Selected TV shows
 The O.C. - Season 2, Episode 7: The Family Ties, feat. Save This Town by Blue Foundation (Warner Bros. Television/Fox Network) 6 January 2005
 CSI: Miami - feat. End of the Day by Blue Foundation (CBS) 2008
 Anna Pihl - feat. Crosshair by Blue Foundation (Cosmo Film/Danish National TV) 2008
 So You Think You Can Dance - 1 episode, Top 14 Perform feat. Eyes On Fire by Blue Foundation (19 Television/20th Century Fox Television) 1 July 2009
 The Cleveland Show - feat. Eyes On Fire by Blue Foundation (20th Century Fox) 30 October 2011
 The Vampire Diaries - Season 4, Episode 8: Eyes On Fire by Blue Foundation 6 December 2012

Music for contemporary dance
 Overloadlady by Sara Gebran. Musical scores by Tobias Wilner (pre-Blue Foundation). Premiered August 1999
 Hurtdetail by Tim Feldmann. Musical scores by Tobias Wilner (Blue Foundation). Premiered at "Plovdiv Center of Contemporary Art" in Bulgaria, on 13 May 2000.
 Hendrix House by Tim Feldmann. Musical scores by Tobias Wilner (Blue Foundation) and David Linton. Premiered at Pakhus 11 April 22nd 2003
 eXPLORnography by Tim Feldmann. Musical scores by Tobias Wilner (Blue Foundation). May 2005

Members
Current members
 Tobias Wilner – vocals, bass guitar, guitar, programming, synthesizer, percussion, production, engineering
 Bo Rande – trumpet, keyboards, synthesizer, percussion, production

Past members
 Daisuke Kiyasu – vj (2003–2006)
 Anders Bertram – guitar (2000–2002)
 Tatsuki Oshima – vinyl manipulation (2003–2007)
 Scott Martingell – spoken words (2003–2008)
 Kirstine Stubbe Teglbjærg – vocals (2000–2009)
 Frederik Hantho – spoken words (2000–2002)
 Hans Landgreen – guitar, bass (2009–2010)
 Mathias Hantho – violin, banjo (2009–2010)
 Christoffer Ohlsson – cello (2003–2006)
 Sune Martin – bass (2003–2007)
 Anders Wallin – bass (2007–2008)
 Nikolaj Bundvig – drums (2006–2007)
 Emil Bernild Ferslev – drums (2000–2001)
 Lasse Herbst – drums (2007–2008)

Side projects
 Ghost Society
 Bichi
 The William Blakes
 Mames Babegenush

See also 
List of ambient music artists

References

External links
 Official website

American pop music groups
Musical groups from Brooklyn
People from Prospect Heights, Brooklyn
Moshi Moshi Records artists
Virgin Records artists